Isabelle Guillot is a  French athlete, born in 1961, who is a specialist in Mountain trail running, who runs for the  Blagnac Sporting Athletic Club. She began to run conventional distance running athletic competitions later, in 1986, while still a young teacher. She is Co-author (with Serge Moro) of the book Courir Grandeur Nature.

Prize list  
  32 National team selections for France, 6 National team selections for France in the marathon, semi-marathon and ekiden .
    World Champion of Mountain Trail running in 1989,  1991,  1993 and 1997      
    Mountain Trail running champion of Europe in 1996      
    World Masters Mountain Running Championships 40-44 age-group in 2004    
    Mountain trail running champion of France 14 times from 1989 to 1997, then 1999, 2004, 2005, 2006 and 2007   
    France champion of veteran Mountain racing 8 times from 2001 to 2008   
    Winner of the National Mountain Running Challenge 6 times from 2003 to 2008   
    French champion in the marathon in 1997   
      Winner of southwest interregional in cross-country in 2001   
      Champion of Midi-Pyrénées in cross-country 2003   
    Marvejols-Mende winner in 1997   
 Semi-marathon  at d'Auch; en 1996    : 1 h 11 min 55 s
   Vice-champion in world mountain racing 1994,  1995 and 1996   
    Vice-champion of France 10   km in 1997   
    Vice-champion of France in mountain racing in 2000, 2003 and 2008
   Bronze Medal (Team) at European Marathon Championships: 1994   
    Bronze medal at the World Trophy Mountain Running Competition in 1988 and 2006.    
    Bronze medal at the World Challenge long-distance mountain race in 2004 and 2005.   
    Bronze medal at the Mountain Running Championship in France in 2001 and 2002.

References

External links  

1961 births
Living people
French female long-distance runners
French female mountain runners
World Mountain Running Championships winners
20th-century French women